Arthur Henry Read (born in 1894) was an English professional footballer. He played for Aberdare Athletic, Gillingham and Lincoln City between 1921 and 1925, making over 100 appearances in the Football League.

References

1894 births
Year of death missing
English footballers
Gillingham F.C. players
Lincoln City F.C. players
Association football midfielders
Aberdare Athletic F.C. players